Madalen Mills (born January 2008) is an American actress.  She is known for her role as Journey in the 2020 Netflix Christmas musical film Jingle Jangle: A Christmas Journey.  She also appeared in the 2022 film The Tiger Rising.

Mills was born in Atlanta and raised in Tuscaloosa, Alabama, where she attended Tuscaloosa Academy and the Tuscaloosa Magnet School.

Filmography

References

External links
 
 

Living people
Actresses from Atlanta
Actresses from Georgia (U.S. state)
Actresses from Alabama
2009 births
People from Tuscaloosa, Alabama
African-American actresses
American stage actresses
American film actresses
21st-century American actresses